Cat Lake First Nation (ᐱᔕᐤ ᓴᑲᐦᐃᑲᐣ) is an Ojibway First Nation reserve approximately 180 kilometres northwest of Sioux Lookout in northwestern Ontario, Canada, located on the central north shore of Cat Lake. , their total registered population was 612 people, of which their on-reserve population was 497.

Cat Lake is policed by the Nishnawbe-Aski Police Service, an Aboriginal-based service.

Cat Lake First Nation is currently in a state of emergency due to the presence of dangerous levels of black mould in the homes.  On March 14, 2019, an agreement worth $12.8 million was agreed to with the federal government to address the crisis.

History
The First Nation calls itself Bizhiw-zaaga'iganiwininiwag meaning "Men of Wild-cat Lake" or as Bizhiw-zaaga'iganiing Nitam Anishinaabeg meaning "The First Nation at Wild-cat Lake," where wild-cat refers to the Canada lynx.  Community of Cat Lake was originally established as a Hudson's Bay Company trading post in 1788, and later belonged to the Osnaburgh Band of Ojibwe. The Cat Lake reserve is within the boundaries of the territory described by the James Bay Treaty of 1905 — Treaty 9. The reserve was formally established on June 22, 1970.  Originally 218 ha and increased to 1771 ha in 2003 under the Government of Canada's Addition to Reserve Policy, the First Nation has reserved itself the Cat Lake 63C Indian Reserve.  The community of Cat Lake, Ontario is located within this reserve. There are approximately 1,100 people living here.

The community maintains strong ties with Mishkeegogamang First Nation.

Governance
The Electoral Council Leadership of the Cat Lake First Nation is under the election process for 2009-11 term, Where a new Senior Executive Cat Lake First Nations Council whereby are now provided as of  June 2011 are as follows; Chief - Ernie Wesley - Deputy Chief - Ellen Oombash - Head Councillor - Allen Sr Ombash Councillor - Harlen Wesley Councillor - Rueben Shakakeesic

The council is a member of the Windigo First Nations Council, a non-political regional chiefs' council.  In turn, the Windigo First Nations Council is a member of the larger Nishnawbe Aski Nation, a Tribal Political Organisation which represents many of the First Nations in northwestern Ontario.

Governance history
The original governance system of the community was that based on the doodem-system, where the hereditary council was established by the families of the appropriate clans, overseen by a hereditary chief. However, the original governance structure for the Cat Lake peoples were altered with the 1905 Treaty 9, and then the Indian Act brought in other leaders from other areas as chiefs for the Cat Lake First Nation.

Transportation
North Star Air, Wasaya Airways and Slate Falls Airways run daily service on regular schedules to Cat Lake Airport. Winter/ice roads also connect from Pickle Lake, Ontario, via the Northern Ontario Resource Trail during the winter months, which takes an average 4 to 5 hours of travel.

Official address
Cat Lake First Nation
PO Box 81
Cat Lake, ON  P0V 1J0

References

External links
 AANDC profile
 Chiefs of Ontario profile
 FirstNation.ca profile
 Roles of Hereditary Chiefs and Councils
 Call for Hereditary Chiefs and Councils to act

Communities in Kenora District
Nishnawbe Aski Nation
Hudson's Bay Company trading posts
Anishinaabe reserves in Ontario
Road-inaccessible communities of Ontario